The 2016 Arizona Democratic presidential primary was held on March 22 in the U.S. state of Arizona as one of the Democratic Party's primaries ahead of the 2016 presidential election.

On the same day, the Democratic Party held caucuses in Idaho and Utah, while the Republican Party held primaries in two states, including their own Arizona primary and a primary in American Samoa.

Voter suppression controversy

There was controversy surrounding the Arizona primary elections of 2016, specifically having to do with the decrease in polling places in Maricopa County from 200 in 2012 to only 60 in 2016, enacted by Republican officials despite the number of registered voters having increased from 300,000 in 2012 to 800,000 in 2016. This decrease in polling places was most pronounced in minority neighborhoods, most notably Latino neighborhoods, with areas like Central Phoenix having only one polling place for 108,000 voters. There were also reports of voters who had been previously registered coming up as unregistered or registered as an independent, making them ineligible to vote in the closed primary. Voters who did manage to vote had to stand in long lines to cast their ballots, some for as long as five hours. Additionally, voters reported being required to vote with a provisional ballot. In 2005, Arizona threw out 27,878 provisional ballots, counting only about 72.5% of the total provisional ballots reported. This was the first election in the state of Arizona since the 2013 Supreme Court decision to strike down Section 5 of the Voting Rights Act of 1965, which would have previously required states with a history of voter discrimination, including Arizona, to receive Federal approval before implementing any changes to voting laws and practices. In Maricopa County, Republican officials have conducted voter purges that disproportionately affected poor and minority areas.

Within a day after the election took place on March 22, a petition went viral on the White House petitions site asking the Department of Justice to investigate voter suppression and election fraud in Arizona. The petition reached 100,000 signatures in 40 hours, and as of June 5, 2016, nearly 220,000 people had signed the petition. The White House responded on May 20, 2016. In addition, Phoenix mayor Greg Stanton asked the Justice Department to launch an investigation into the allegations of voter suppression.

Both the Clinton and Sanders campaigns, as well as the Democratic National Committee, sued the Arizona state government over the alleged voter suppression. The Department of Justice has since launched a federal investigation into the primary.

Opinion polling

Results

Detailed results per congressional district

Results by county

Analysis
A Clinton win in Arizona was expected; she had beat Barack Obama in the state eight years earlier by a similar wide margin, and she generally performed well with minority voters in the 2016 primaries. She won in counties with high populations of Hispanic voters, including the largest county Maricopa where the capital city of Phoenix is located, and she also performed well in counties with large populations of Native Americans including Apache County and Navajo County. Sanders won only in Coconino County.

Bernie Sanders made a late play for the state of Arizona, including airing Spanish-language ads featuring Congressman Raúl Grijalva. Hillary Clinton offset his efforts with advertising featuring former Congresswoman Gabby Giffords, and airing radio ads in the Navajo language.

References

Arizona
Democratic primary
2016
Electoral fraud in the United States
Voter suppression
March 2016 events in the United States